Nopsma is a genus of tropical spiders in the family Caponiidae. It was first described by A. Sánchez-Ruiz, Antônio Domingos Brescovit and A. B. Bonaldo in 2020. It was originally described under the name "Nyetnops juchuy" in 2014. They are found in Central and South America.

Species
 it contains seven species:
N. armandoi Sánchez-Ruiz, Brescovit & Bonaldo, 2020 – Nicaragua
N. enriquei Sánchez-Ruiz, Brescovit & Bonaldo, 2020 – Peru
N. florencia Sánchez-Ruiz, Brescovit & Bonaldo, 2020 – Colombia
N. juchuy (Dupérré, 2014) – Ecuador
N. leticia Sánchez-Ruiz, Martínez & Bonaldo, 2021 – Colombia
N. macagual Sánchez-Ruiz, Martínez & Bonaldo, 2021 – Colombia
N. paya Sánchez-Ruiz, Martínez & Bonaldo, 2021 – Colombia

See also
 Nyetnops
 List of Caponiidae species

References

Further reading

Caponiidae genera
Taxa named by Antônio Brescovit
Spiders of South America
Spiders of Central America